Sascha Benecken (born 14 February 1990) is a German luger who has competed since 1999.

Luge results
All results are sourced from the  International Luge Federation (FIL).

World Cup

References

External links

1990 births
Living people
People from Suhl
German male lugers
Sportspeople from Thuringia
Olympic lugers of Germany
Lugers at the 2014 Winter Olympics
Lugers at the 2018 Winter Olympics
Lugers at the 2022 Winter Olympics
Olympic silver medalists for Germany
Olympic bronze medalists for Germany
Olympic medalists in luge
Medalists at the 2018 Winter Olympics
Medalists at the 2022 Winter Olympics
Recipients of the Silver Laurel Leaf
21st-century German people